Scopus is a genus of wading birds containing the hamerkop (Scopus umbretta) and its extinct Pliocene relative, Scopus xenopus. This genus is the sole representative of the family Scopidae.

Taxonomy
Hamerkops were traditionally included in the Ciconiiformes, but are now thought to be closer to the Pelecaniformes. Recent studies have found that its closest relatives are the pelicans and shoebill.

References

Bird genera
Bird genera with one living species
Taxa named by Mathurin Jacques Brisson
Pelecaniformes